The titular nation is the single dominant ethnic group in a particular state, typically after which the state was named. The term was first used by Maurice Barrès in the late 19th century.
Countries

Soviet Union
The notion was used in the Soviet Union to denote nations that give rise to titles of autonomous entities within the union: Soviet republics, autonomous republics, autonomous regions, etc., such as Byelorussian SSR for Belarusians.

For an ethnos to become a Soviet titular nation, it had to satisfy certain criteria in terms of the amount of population and compactness of its settlement. The language of a titular nation was declared an additional (after Russian) official language of the corresponding administrative unit.

The notion worked well for the cases of well established, homogeneous and relatively developed nations.

In a number of cases, in certain highly multiethnic regions, such as North Caucasus, the notion of a titular nation introduced intrinsic inequality between titular and non-titular nations, especially since the introduction of the "korenizatsiya" politics, according to which representatives of a titular nation were promoted to management positions.

China
The People's Republic of China government has adopted some of the principles behind this Soviet concept in its ethnic minority policy—see Autonomous administrative divisions of China.

Yugoslavia
The federal republics of Socialist Yugoslavia were perceived as nation-states of the constitutional peoples. After the breakup of Yugoslavia, only Bosnia and Herzegovina was not defined in its constitution as a nation-state of its titular nation de jure because of its multi-ethnic society but is de facto separated by 98% in rural areas in the country and 85% in urban areas.

See also
 Lenin's national policy
 Nation state
 Princely state

References

Soviet internal politics
Political science terminology
Nation
Maurice Barrès